Jacob Johan Anckarström (11 May 1762 – 27 April 1792) was a Swedish military officer who is known as the assassin of King Gustav III of Sweden. He was convicted and executed for regicide.

Life
He was the son of Jacob Johan Anckarström the Elder and Hedvig Ulrika Drufva. He married Gustaviana Elisabet Löwen (1764-1844) in 1783, and had two daughters and two sons: Gustafva Eleonora Löwenström (1785-1860), Carolina Lovisa, Johan Jacob and Carl David.

Anckarström served as a page at court and then as a captain in King Gustav III's regiment between 1778 and 1783. During travels to Gotland, he was accused of slandering the king and fled to Stockholm, where he spent the winter; he was subsequently arrested, brought back, and tried in Gotland. Although he was acquitted due to lack of evidence, he later maintained in his confession that this incident sparked his fire of hatred towards the king, fuelled by the contemporary revolutionary movement in Europe.

The Swedish nobles were about this time violently opposed to the king, who, by the aid of the other orders of the state, had wrested their power from them and was now ruling despotically. This dislike was increased by the coup d'état of 1789 and by the king's known desire to interfere in favor of Louis XVIII in France. Anckarström, a man of strong passions and violent temper, resolved upon the assassination of Gustav and communicated his intention to other disaffected nobles, including Counts Horn and Ribbing.

Initial attempts to seize the king were failures.

The murder
On 16 March 1792, Gustav III had returned to Stockholm, after spending the day at Haga Palace outside the city, to dine and visit a masquerade ball at the Royal Opera. During dinner, the king received an anonymous letter (written by the colonel of the Life Guards, Carl Pontus Lilliehorn) that contained a threat to his life, but as the king had received numerous threatening letters in the past, he chose to ignore the warning.

After dining, the king with Baron Hans Henrik von Essen at his right arm went around the theatre once and then into the foyer where they met Captain Carl Fredrik Pollet. The king, von Essen and Pollet continued through a corridor towards the scene where several dancers and masked men filled the tiles. Due to the crowd, Pollet receded behind the king, who then turned backwards to talk to Pollet.

Anckarström stood at the entrance to the corridor and edged himself behind the king, took out a pistol from his left inner pocket and either he or Count Ribbing, who was next to him, pulled the trigger. Because of the king turning backwards the shot went in at an angle left of the third lumbar vertebrae towards the left hip region. The shot consisted of two bullets, furniture tacks and bits of lead clippings; Anckarström later confessed that the composition of the shot was intended to be as lethal as possible.

The king twitched and said “aee” without falling. Anckarström then lost courage; he had thought that the king would fall directly. Bewildered, Anckarström dropped the pistol and knife on the floor, took a few steps and shouted fire. He quickly went towards the entrance, but the guard had already closed the doors. Despondent, he hid his second pistol and mixed with the crowd. His intention had been to shoot himself with the second pistol. Witnesses told the court that Anckarström had been agitated and asked if the king was badly wounded. All guests at the masquerade were forced to give their names before leaving the house. 

In the 19th Century the history of the assassination was embellished upon, embellishments that still are taken as facts today. Most notably is the tale of how one of the conspirators (often Claes Fredrik Horn) taps the king on the shoulder and saying “bonsoir, beau masque” (Good evening, beautiful masque) to point out Anckarström's target. The other embellishment would be that the king was shot at a certain point in a counter dance, “Plaisir de Grönsöö”. The conductor, so the legend goes, marked the sound of the shot in his notes and the music stopped. But the court records show that few people noticed the shot and the music continued playing for some time afterwards.

Anckarström's pistols, legend aside, were brought around to several gunsmiths the next morning and one who had repaired them for Anckarström recognized them and identified him as their owner. Anckarström was arrested the same morning and immediately confessed to the murder, although he denied a conspiracy until he was informed that Horn and Ribbing had been arrested and confessed in full.

Anckarström was jailed in a prison not far from the Royal Palace in Stockholm. Today the former prison is an underground restaurant named after the viceroy Sten Sture.

Curiously, the murder had been predicted to the king four years earlier, when he paid an anonymous visit to the celebrated medium of the Gustavian era, Ulrica Arfvidsson. She was often employed by his brother, Duke Charles, and was said to have a large net of informers all over town; she was never suspected to be involved, but she was questioned about the murder. In 1791, Charlotta Roos also predicted misfortune to King Gustav III, something he reportedly referred to on his death bed after the assassination.

Execution
Gustav III died of his wounds on 29 March and on 16 April Anckarström was sentenced. He was stripped of his estates and nobility privileges. He was sentenced to be cast in irons for three days and publicly flogged, his right hand to be cut off, his head removed, and his corpse quartered. The execution took place on 27 April 1792. He endured his sufferings with the greatest fortitude, and seemed to rejoice in having rid his country of a tyrant. His principal accomplices Ribbing and Horn were stripped of titles and estates and expelled from the country.

Aftermath
In the same year, the Anckarström family changed its surname to Löwenström and donated funds for a hospital as a gift of appeasement. This resulted in the Löwenström Hospital, or Löwenströmska lasarettet in Upplands Väsby north of Stockholm. Living descendants of Anckarström include Ulf Adelsohn, and solo sailor Sven Yrvind.

Operas
Anckarström is a character in Daniel Auber's opera Gustave III and Giuseppe Verdi's Un ballo in maschera (A Masked Ball). In the operas, his motivation is changed to jealousy over his wife Amelia, with whom Gustav is portrayed as being in love. He is actually portrayed as being Gustav's close friend before he switches allegiances. Gustav pardons him with his last breath. In the censored version of the Verdi libretto, set in Colonial-era Boston, he is called Renato (Rene).

References

Citations

Bibliography
 
 
 
 
 
 .

1762 births
1792 deaths
1792 crimes in Europe
Swedish regicides
Executed Swedish people
People executed by Sweden by decapitation
Executed assassins
Swedish people convicted of murder
People convicted of murder by Sweden
People from Stockholm
18th-century Swedish nobility
18th-century executions by Sweden
Gustavian era people